Scleria greigiifolia is a plant in the family Cyperaceae. It grows as a perennial herb.

Distribution and habitat
Scleria greigiifolia grows naturally in central to southern Africa and Madagascar. Its habitat is dambos, bogs, wet places near streams and lakes, and seasonally flooded grasslands.

References

greigiifolia
Flora of the Central African Republic
Flora of the Democratic Republic of the Congo
Flora of East Tropical Africa
Flora of South Tropical Africa
Flora of South Africa
Flora of Madagascar
Plants described in 1883